Ninth grade, freshman year, or grade 9 is the ninth year of school education in some school systems. Ninth grade is often the first school year of high school in the United States, or the last year of middle/junior high school. In some countries, Grade 9 is the second year of high school. Students are usually 14–15 years old. In the United States, it is often called the freshman year.

Afghanistan
In Afghanistan, ninth grade is the first year of high school.

Argentina
In Argentina, this is "Second Year" 3 years or (depending on the province) "Third Year". Students are aged 13–14 during the first part of the year and 14-15 during the second part of the year.
This is because, in Argentina, there's kindergarten, high school primary school, and secondary school. In some provinces of the country primary is from "1st grade" to "7th grade" and secondary school from "1st year" to "5th year". In other provinces, primary school is from "1st grade" to "6th grade", and secondary school from "1st year" to "6th year" or "7th grade", if the school has it. All technical schools have "7th grade". So basically there are between 12 and 13 (most schools), years of school in the Argentinian Educative System, without counting kindergarten, which can be from 3-6 or 2–5 years old.

Australia
In Australia, secondary school (sometimes referred to as high school) starts in Year 7.

Belgium
In Belgium, the 9th grade is called derde middelbaar in the Dutch-speaking north and 3e secondaire in the French-speaking south. In some bureaus of the country, the 9th grade can be removed from one's educator curriculum to put the student in an appropriate class study level.

Brazil
The minimum age to enter in the ninth grade is 14 years old. All students must be 14 years old before the cut-off date.

Canada
In much of Canada, Grade 9 is the first year of high school (though in some areas they still use the old system of junior and senior high, where grade 9 is the last year of junior high). Some schools combine junior and senior years into one school. In Quebec, Grade 9 is the middle year of its five-year high school program, unlike in the rest of Canada.

Denmark
In Denmark, ninth grade is around the same thing as in Sweden. Afterwards, one can choose to go through tenth grade, but it is not required. The students are 15–16 years old. Ninth grade is the year of first final exams and the last year of "folkeskolen" (the first 10 years of education. Starts from 0th grade to 9th grade). After they can choose the 10th grade, or go to a brand new school of higher education for two (HF, 2-year STX)or three years (STX, HHX, HTX).

The first year of higher education is called 1.g (16–17 years old), the second year is 2.g (17-18) and the third year is 3.g (18-19). The age depends on when one started 0th grade and if one took 10th grade. When a student finishes 3.g, they get a white hat (studenterhue), with either a blue or a red ribbon around it. The colour of the ribbon depends on the school (HF = light blue, HTX = dark purple, HHX = blue; STX = red). An education at STX involves all the lessons one can have in Denmark, while HHX and HTX are typically the lessons one chooses.

After those two or three years, a student can go to a university/college to get even higher education (usually at the years of 19/20 until they finish). In STX, a student learns Danish, French/Spanish/German/Italian (at least one these), English, math, physics, chemistry, biology, health, Latin, nature geography, GLU (general language understanding), art/drama/media course/music (at least one of these as artistic lessons), history, psychology/philosophy, classical studies, and social studies. In HHX, HTX a student chooses some of these lessons. A student can have the lessons on an A-level (means every three years), B-level (two of the years), C-level (one of the years). In STX a student must have Danish and history at an A-level, and English at either A or B. The rest can be made up by choice, and it can be changed.

The levels of the lessons also depend on the subject line one chose. There are the linguistic lines, the social study lines, the math lines, the chemistry lines, the physics lines, the biotech lines, the music lines and sports lines. Health lessons are either on a C or B-level, but no matter what one chose they have it every year.

A student goes to exams in 1.g, 2.g and 3.g.

The grades are following (starting with the worst, ending with the best): -3: unacceptable. 00: failed. 02: acceptable. 4: low average. 7: high average. 10: over the average. 12: much over the average.

Finland
In Finland, ninth grade is the last year of compulsory schooling. The students are usually 14 – 16 years old. Afterwards, they can choose to go through tenth grade but it is not required. The meaning of tenth grade is to allow improving grades.

France
In France, the equivalent grade is the troisième or "3e" and it is the final middle school year before high school.

Students prepare to take the "Diplôme National du Brevet" (DNB) examination - it's the first diploma given to French students, and attests of basic levels in major high school disciplines (French, Mathematics, History and Geography and sciences. They also have an oral on a subject they have to choose. And the grades of all the year of 3e also counts for the results). This diploma is not necessary to proceed on to high school.

Germany
In Germany, the equivalent grade is 9. Klasse.

Greece
In Greece, ninth grade is called third year of gymnasium school or middle school or lower secondary school (Triti Gymnasiou - Τρίτη Γυμνασίου)

Hong Kong
In Hong Kong, 9th grade is called Form 3/ Secondary 3. Students finishing Form 3 are needed to select their electives for them to study in Grade 10 (Form 4), Grade 11 (Form 5)and Grade 12 (Form 6). Some special schools made their students choose their electives after 8th grade (form 2)

India
After the National Education Policy 2020 9th grade in India is the freshman year of high school. In the 9th grade students get to choose 5 subjects of their choice. Mathematics, English, Science and Social Science are compulsory. There are various options for the second language like Sanskrit & Hindi. 
9th grade is also important as it is the preparatory year for the 10th standard Board exams that will serve as the 1st exam out of 2 in order to pass out of high school.

Ireland
In Ireland, it is the Third Year or Tríú Bhliain of Secondary School (for 14- and 15-year-olds) this is known as 3rd year. This year is the year students take the Junior Certificate or Teastas Sóisearach.

Italy
In Italy, it is the first year of the upper secondary school (which translates into Scuola secondaria di secondo grado, informally called Scuola Superiore). In Italy ninth grade is called prima superiore. Usually, students are between 14 and 15 years old.

Kuwait
In Kuwait, ninth grade is the last year of middle school.

Malaysia
In Malaysia, the equivalent of 9th grade is Form 3 (Tingkatan 3). Students are 15 years old, and it is their third year of secondary school. In Form 3, all students are required to sit for a mandatory exam throughout all government schools called PT3 (Pentaksiran Tingkatan 3, or Form 3 Assessment). Upon receiving their results, students will be allowed to choose a stream (the subjects of their focus for the next year) of their choice, depending on their results, which will then allow them to proceed to Form 4 in the following year.

Mexico
In Mexico, ninth grade is the last year of middle school. The students are aged 14–15.

New Zealand
In New Zealand, Year 10 (formerly Form 4) is the equivalent of ninth grade, with students aged 14 or 15 during the year. It is the second year of secondary school and the tenth year of compulsory education. Students in Year 10 typically study English, mathematics, science, social science, and health and physical education, with students electing subjects out of the arts, technology, and learning a language.

Norway
In Norway, 9th grade is the middle grade of middle school, "ungdomskolen". Students are 14–15 years old.

Pakistan
In Pakistan, 9th grade has a great importance as it is the base of higher education and is part of High School. At this level students are allowed to choose subjects of their will. These subjects are:
Biology
Computer
Arts
The compulsory subjects are:
Math
Urdu
English Language
Islamiyat
Pakistan studies
Marks of grade 9 are half of collective 9th and 10th marks.

Philippines
In the Philippines, Grade 9 or Junior Year is the third year of Junior High School and High School curriculum. Topics mainly discussed are the following subjects like, for the major subjects are Geometry (Math in Grade 9), Chemistry, Physics, Biology and Earth Science (Science in Grade 9), Filipino subject with Noli Me Tangere, Anglo-American Literature (English) and Philippine Economical Study (Political Studies in Grade 9). Values Education, MAPEH (Music, Arts, Physical Education and Health), Computer and TLE (Technology and Livelihood Education) are some of the minor subjects. Students are usually 14–15 or 13-14 years old.

It was formerly named as 3rd Year or Year III until it changed to Grade 9 on June 2, 2014 upon the start of School Year 2014-2015 due to the implementation of the K-12 curriculum.

Portugal
In Portugal, the ninth grade (nono ano, 9º ano) is the last year of the three-year 3º Ciclo do Ensino Básico that also includes the seventh grade and the eighth grade. It is followed by the tenth grade, the first year of the three-year Ensino Secundário. At the end of the ninth grade, students must take national final exams (Provas finais nacionais).

Singapore
In Singapore, 9th grade is called Secondary 3, and it is the third year of one's secondary education. Students are usually 15 years old.

Spain
Ninth Grade in Spanish is called 3º de ESO (Tercero de Educación Secundaria Obligatoria), as it is the third year of the compulsory secondary education. Students are usually 14–15 years old. A secondary school in Spain has a four-year duration. Students in Spain generally start secondary school at the age of 12 and finish at the age of 16. The school year starts in September and lasts until the next year in June.

Sweden
In Sweden, ninth grade is the last year of högstadiet (Middle school). The students are usually between 15 and 16 years old. That makes ninth grade an important grade for almost every student.

United Kingdom

England and Wales
In English and Welsh schools, 9th grade is equivalent to Year 10 (called Year 11 in Northern Ireland), and is for those aged 14 to 15. 

Some 93 per cent of school children in England and Wales attend state-funded comprehensive, secondary, or grammar schools, which most enter at the age of 11, taking GCSE exams at the end of the academic year (September 1 – August 31) in which their 16th birthday falls. Compulsory education continues beyond 16, when state-funded students can choose to remain at school in the "Sixth Form" or attend a sixth form college or further education college to take AS levels and A-levels or follow vocational courses or apprenticeships.

In independent secondary schools, most children enter at the age of 13 and leave after A-levels, aged 18. In these schools, Year 10 is typically the second year of education.

Scotland
In Scotland, this is the third year (or S3) of a state-funded secondary school. Most children are aged 14–15. In S3 students will pick subjects to study for " National 4/5 exams" in S4, which are the qualifications they will need for college and or university. In independent schools the position is as for England and Wales.

United States
In the United States, ninth grade is usually the first year in high school. In this system, ninth graders are also often referred to as freshmen. It can also be the last year of junior high school. The typical age for U.S. 9th grade students is 14 to 15 years.

In the math curriculum, ninth graders are usually taught algebra, but advanced math includes geometry or algebra II. Advanced courses are usually available to ninth graders who are prepared for a more rigorous curriculum, depending on the school district. Some districts across the country allow their 10th graders to take trigonometry or AP Statistics, or even calculus if the district provides, but most often, the highest level available to be taken as a 10th grader is pre-calculus.

In the English curriculum, most schools still have the same levels of basic courses, advanced courses, and honors courses. The basic level for a 9th grader is often listed as English I (may also be called English 9). This course will often teach the fundamentals of higher-level literature and how to analyze and respond to such literature. The advanced course is often English II (may also be called English 10) depending on the school district and is usually a genre studies type of English class, but it may instead be focused on one type of literature, such as American literature or British literature.

In the social studies curriculum, there is a variety of different courses that may be offered. Most often, though, the course is either a geography class, a government class, or a world history class.

In the science curriculum, ninth grade students are required, in most areas, to take biology.

Most high school students are required to have one carnegie unit of computer science, one unit of physical education, and one unit of health education to graduate.
Students are usually offered foreign language this year. This is often the first introduction of a foreign language to the students. The average cutoff date is generally variable, but on average being somewhere between August 31st and September 30th.

See also
 Educational stage
 First grade
 Second grade
 Third grade
 Fourth grade
 Fifth grade
 Sixth grade
 Seventh grade
 Eighth grade
 Tenth grade
 Eleventh grade
 Twelfth grade
 University

Further reading
  - Advisor: Ronald Styron

9
Secondary education